ITM University is a multidisciplinary private university  based in Gwalior, India. The subjects are offered in the field of sciences, engineering, management, fine arts, social sciences, arts, and nursing. It was established under the Act of State Legislature Madhya Pradesh and is notified in the Official Gazette (extraordinary) of the State Government.

Campus 

ITM University is located at a highly visible site on NH 75 in the city of Gwalior, Madhya Pradesh. Each department has its own building with laboratory, library and computer facilities. The 'NAAD' amphitheater has a seating capacity of more than 3000 people is being used for cultural and co-curricular activities of the Institutes. The university has 4 Boy's hostel & 1 Girl's hostel, namely Nalanda, Narmada, Sadipani, Shantiniketan and Girls Cottage of bedding 120, 320, 320, 200,& 120 respectively with two blocks of mess & dining of approximately 26,000 sq. feet with a semi-mechanized system of cooking, having enough space for dining & mess facility for 600 & 520 respectively persons at a time. The campus also has an auditorium, on-campus nursing home and a 24-hour functional OPD, a gymnasium along with badminton, volleyball, handball, basketball courts & Indoors's play. ITM University recently opened the gates of new building named J.C.Bose Block.

Schools

 School of Engineering and Technology
 School of Computer Applications
 School Of Business
 School of Art & Design
 School of Physical Education & Sports
 School of Nursing Sciences
 School of Medical and Paramedical Sciences
 School of Pharmacy
 School of Science
 School of Agriculture
 School of Architecture & Design
 School of Education
 School of Fine Arts
 School of Law
 School of Humanities and Literary Studies

Annual festivals

KRONOS: The annual youth festival KRONOS, is a four-day national level techno-cultural fest organized by the Student's Activity Council of ITM Universe. Started in 2010, KRONOS is held in the month of March or April. It has technical events (in collaboration with by the ISOI, CSI, IETE and ISTE Student Chapters) and cultural events. Teams from ITM and other colleges participate to win prizes in various events during the festival. The main attractions are performances by national and international bands.

TIMS (Technology Innovation Management for Sustainable Development): Features a technical programme including keynote speeches, panel discussion, oral and poster sessions and cultural programme.

References

External links

All India Council for Technical Education
Information technology institutes
Private universities in India
Engineering colleges in Madhya Pradesh
Universities in Madhya Pradesh
Universities and colleges in Gwalior
Educational institutions established in 1997
1997 establishments in Madhya Pradesh